Audubon House may refer to:

Audubon House and Tropical Gardens, in Key West, Florida.
 Audubon House, in Vero Beach, Florida
"Audubon House", the former headquarters of the National Audubon Society, in Manhattan, New York City